Robert Robertson McFarlane (12 October 1913−1971) was a Scottish footballer who played as a wing half in the Football League for Doncaster Rovers.

Born in Bo'ness, Scotland, McFarlane played for Southern Football League club Margate in the 1935−36 season, including a 3rd Round FA Cup tie at Blackpool which was lost 3−1. He was signed by Arsenal the next season but failed to make any appearances.

For the 1937−38 season he moved to Division 3 North side Doncaster where he played in 145 League and cup games, scoring 6 times, before and after the war. Doncaster won the league title in 1946−47 leading to a season in Division 2 for McFarlane, though he only appeared in 13 games in what was an unsuccessful relegation season for the club.

From 1948−50, he played for Boston United in the Midland League.

He died in Doncaster in 1971.

Honours
Doncaster Rovers
 Division 3 North
Champions 1946−47

Runners Up 1937−38, 1938−39

References

1913 births
1971 deaths
People from Bo'ness
Scottish footballers
Association football wing halves
Margate F.C. players
Arsenal F.C. players
Doncaster Rovers F.C. players
Boston United F.C. players
English Football League players